Lady Frances Balfour (née Campbell; 22 February 1858 – 25 February 1931) was a British aristocrat, author, and suffragist. She was one of the highest-ranking members of the British aristocracy to assume a leadership role in the Women's suffrage campaign in the United Kingdom. Balfour was a member of the executive committee of the National Society for Women's Suffrage from 1896 to 1919. As a non-violent suffragist, she was opposed to the militant actions of the Women's Social and Political Union, whose members were called the suffragettes.

Life
The tenth child of British Liberal politician and Scottish peer George Campbell, 8th Duke of Argyll, and his wife, Lady Elizabeth Sutherland-Leveson-Gower (eldest daughter of the 2nd Duke of Sutherland), she was born at Argyll Lodge in Kensington, London. Lady Frances Campbell had a hip joint disease and from early childhood was in constant pain and walked with a limp. Her parents were deeply religious and involved in several different campaigns for social reform. She reportedly helped with these campaigns as a child, for example by knitting garments to be sent to the children of former slaves after slavery was formally banned by the government within the British territories in 1833.

In 1879 she married Eustace Balfour, a London-based Scottish architect. Eustace's uncle, Lord Salisbury, had three terms as Britain's prime minister. Eustace's elder brother, Arthur Balfour, was also a Conservative British prime minister from 1902 to 1905. However, in opposition to the Conservative politics of her in-laws, Frances, along with both her parents, supported Liberal statesman William Gladstone and his government when she was a young woman. Lady Frances Balfour and her husband never overcame these political differences and spent less and less time together.

Suffrage

She was the only member of the aristocracy and the only Scot to have a leadership role in the British women's suffrage campaign.  She began her work for women's suffrage in 1889, when she became the constitutionalists' main liaison with Parliament. In 1897, she became a member of the executive committee of the newly formed National Union of Women's Suffrage Societies (NUWSS), whose President was Mrs. Millicent Garrett Fawcett, and served in this capacity from its inception until some women got the vote in 1918. She was also the President of the London Society of Women's Suffrage, the largest single suffrage group in Britain, from 1896 to 1919. In addition, She served as President of the Lyceum Club, which rendered services to professional women, from 1903 to 1915. When her work for votes for women was almost over, Frances joined the National Council of Women in 1917, and served as president from 1921 to 1923. 

Lady Frances published six books, including her autobiography Ne Obliviscaris (Dinna Forget) and she was joint editor of Women and Progress with Nora Vynne. The magazine was dedicated to achieving equal citizen rights for men and women. They were happy to see younger women excluded from having the vote, as long as it applied equally to young men as well. The magazine appeared to be about to be a success when shortage of funds obliged it to fold in June 1914. Today the magazine serves as a good source of early suffragette history.

Lyceum Club
The writer Constance Smedley had decided to start a new type of club for women. Another proposed founder, Jessie Trimble, proposed that the new club be called the Lyceum Club, and the new committee arranged for Smedley to meet Lady Frances Balfour. The committee had decided to extend their net for new members from writers, to professional women and even the daughters or wives of prominent men. Balfour agreed to lead the new club and served as their chair for 15 years.

Death 
She died in London on 25 February 1931 from bronchial pneumonia and heart failure, and was buried at Whittingehame, the Balfour family home in East Lothian, Scotland.

Publications 
 Dr Elsie Inglis (1920) 
 The Life of George, Fourth Earl of Aberdeen (1923)
 Lady Victoria Campbell: a memoir (1911)
 A Memoir of Lord Balfour of Burleigh, KT. (1924)
 The Very Rev. Principal Story, D.D. (1909)[No, she published Dr MacGregor of St Cuthberts:  A Memoir in 1912.  Principle Story was a memoir by Dr. Story's daughters.  
 Life and Letters if the Reverend James MacGregor (1912)
 Ne Obliviscaris. Dinna Forget. (1930)
 In Memoriam the Lady Frances Balfour, 1881-1931 (Newspaper cuttings compiled by the Committee of the Travellers' Aid Society (1931)

Distinctions 
 She received honorary degrees from the University of Durham (DLitt 1919) and from the University of Edinburgh (LLD 1921)
 Her name and picture (and those of 58 other women's suffrage supporters) are on the plinth of the statue of Millicent Fawcett in Parliament Square, London, unveiled in 2018.

References

1858 births
1931 deaths
19th-century English women
20th-century English memoirists
20th-century English women writers
Writers from London
British people with disabilities
Daughters of British dukes
English feminists
English suffragists
Nonviolence advocates
Women of the Victorian era
Liberal Party (UK) politicians
Frances
Clan Campbell
Deaths from pneumonia in England
Deaths from bronchopneumonia
British women memoirists
Presidents of the National Council of Women of Great Britain
National Society for Women's Suffrage
English people of Scottish descent